Balmoor Bridge is a toll-free, three-span bridge in Aberdeenshire, Scotland. A Category B listed structure, it spans the River Ugie, carrying the two lanes of traffic of the A90 to or from Peterhead to the south or St Fergus to the north. It was designed by John Willet, and features two semi-circular arches and voussoirs.

References

External links
Inverugie, Balmoor Bridge - Canmore.org.uk

Listed buildings in Peterhead
Bridges in Aberdeenshire
Transport in Aberdeenshire
Transport in Peterhead
Category B listed buildings in Aberdeenshire
Listed bridges in Scotland
Bridges completed in 1884
1884 establishments in Scotland